Qeysariyeh or Qaisariyeh may refer to:
 Qeysariyeh, East Azerbaijan
 Qeysariyeh, Kerman
 Qeysariyeh-ye Olya, Khuzestan Province
 Qeysariyeh-ye Sofla, Khuzestan Province
 Qeysariyeh-ye Vosta, Khuzestan Province
 Qeysariyeh Bazaar, in Isfahan